The Buick Rendezvous is a mid-size crossover SUV that was sold by Buick for the 2002–2007 model years. Introduced in the spring of 2001, the Buick Rendezvous and its corporate cousin, the Pontiac Aztek, were GM's first entries into the crossover SUV segment. The Rendezvous featured a four-speed automatic transmission with a V6 engine and optional all-wheel-drive (Versatrak). The SUV used the same platform as GM's short-wheelbase minivans, the Chevrolet Venture and Pontiac Montana. The Rendezvous provided a passenger- and load-carrying capacity not seen in the Buick lineup since the discontinuation of the Buick Roadmaster Estate station wagon in 1996.

Technology and notable features

It was Buick's first truck in its lineup since 1923, and the Rendezvous was billed as a combination of the best attributes of a minivan (large cargo capacity, seating for up to seven), a luxury automobile (ride, handling, smoothness) and a sport utility vehicle (truck styling and available all wheel drive).

The Rendezvous was produced at General Motors' Ramos Arizpe, Mexico assembly plant, where it shared an assembly line with the Pontiac Aztek. Like the Pontiac Aztek, the Buick Rendezvous is based on a shortened version of GM's second generation U platform minivans. In lieu of four-wheel drive, the Rendezvous offered Versatrak, a full-time, fully automatic all-wheel drive system which provided sure-footed traction in inclement weather and could handle moderate off-road surfaces.

Buick benchmarked their Park Avenue sedan as the prototypical target for ride and handling for the Rendezvous. In order to provide a luxurious and responsive car-like ride, all Rendezvous came equipped with a fully independent rear suspension system regardless of optional content or trim level.

The Rendezvous' instrument cluster detailing featured teal illuminated needles and numbers set in a silver face accented by chrome trim rings that was meant to evoke the luxurious look and feel of an expensive watch or designer bracelet. On the uplevel CXL model, a driver information center on the instrument panel provided the outside temperature, compass functions, a trip computer that included readings of fuel economy, range and fuel used. An optional second generation heads-up display was also available. This was also available in the CX model. An optional tire inflation monitoring system provided readings of tire pressure and warned if out of the specified range.

The Rendezvous boasted the ability to carry seven passengers when equipped with a third-row bench, a class-leading feature that Buick brought to market before its competitors, and was able to carry within its interior a standard 4 x 8' sheet of plywood.

In support of the Rendezvous' intended role as a versatile accoutrement for busy people with families, it provided a center console with storage space and power points for a laptop computer as well as a separate spots to hold a purse, a cell phone, pager or other small items that the owner would want to keep organized and readily accessible as well as an optional rear cargo organizer system and rear seat stereo system controls with headsets.

Safety
The Insurance Institute for Highway Safety (IIHS) gives Rendezvous an overall Acceptable rating in its frontal offset crash test for fair structure performance and fair dummy control. However, the IIHS did not perform a side-impact test on the Rendezvous.

Sales success
The Rendezvous was a badly needed success for Buick, given the decline of its aging customer base, and singlehandedly brought a large number of younger, wealthier "conquest" buyers into Buick showrooms who otherwise would not have considered purchasing a Buick. A major contributor to the Rendezvous's success was an aggressive value-pricing strategy that made the Rendezvous US$6,500 less than a comparably equipped Acura MDX and US$8,000 less than the Lexus RX. The Rendezvous handily exceeded GM's predictions of 30,000 to 40,000 units a year by a large margin, which helped offset the poor sales of the Pontiac Aztek with which it shared its Ramos Arizpe, Mexico, assembly line.

Year to year changes

2003
 Optional Rear Seat DVD system is now offered
 Optional XM Satellite Radio is now offered

2004
Front turn signal/parking lights changed to clear from the previously used amber.
The Ultra was added as a top-line model, with all comfort options standard, 17 inch aluminium wheels, leather and ultrasuede seating as well as a theft deterrent system.
OnStar is now available on the Rendezvous as an optional feature.

2005
The Ultra was available with front-wheel drive.
The 3.6 L V6 was now an option for the front-wheel drive CXL.
Received chrome Buick tri-shield steering wheel.
Leather-wrapped steering wheel standard.

2006
Quiet Tuning added to model
OnStar is now standard on the Rendezvous
Rear park-assist is also now made standard on the Rendezvous
3.5 liter V6 Standard
Received chrome Buick tri-shield in grille
A black faced instrument cluster replaced the all silver one used in prior years (2005 in some models)
Ultra Dropped for CXL+

2007
OnStar Direction and Connections with turn-by-turn navigation
Available in CX, and CXL Trims
Available only in Front Wheel Drive
Standard Mahogany Trimmed Wheel on CXL, Optional on CX
Standard Third Row Seat on CXL Trim
Last Year for the Buick Rendezvous

Sales

References

External links

 Buick Rendezvous Official Web Page
 Buick Rendezvous from TopSpeed

Rendezvous
Cars introduced in 2001
Cars discontinued in 2007
Crossover sport utility vehicles
Compact sport utility vehicles
All-wheel-drive vehicles
Front-wheel-drive vehicles